The Charlottetown Conference (Canada's Conference) was held in Charlottetown, Prince Edward Island for representatives from colonies of British North America to discuss Canadian Confederation. The conference took place between September 1 through 9, 1864. The conference had been planned as a meeting of representatives from the Maritime colonies; Nova Scotia, New Brunswick and Prince Edward Island. Newfoundland agreed with the movement, but was not notified in time to take part in the proceedings. Britain encouraged a Maritime Union between these colonies, hoping that they would then become less economically and politically dependent on the Crown, and provide for greater economic and military power for the region in light of the American Civil War. However, another colony, the Province of Canada, comprising present-day Ontario and Québec, heard news of the planned conference and asked that the agenda be expanded to discuss a union that would also include them. In August 1864 Newfoundland also asked to be allowed to join the conference.

Coincidentally there was a circus in Charlottetown during the conference, and it was much more interesting to the majority of the population. At the very least, the circus made making accommodations for all the delegates difficult, since there had not been a circus in Prince Edward Island in over 20 years. There was no one working at the public wharf at the foot of Great George Street when the Canadian delegates arrived on the steamship SS Victoria, so Prince Edward Island representative William Henry Pope had to handle receptions by himself, including rowing out to greet the new arrivals. Owing to the unexpectedly large number of visitors in the city, a sizeable proportion of the Canadian delegates remained aboard the Queen Victoria while others found accommodations at the Franklin. Meanwhile, circus-goers and the Maritime delegates had taken up the accommodations in town.

Conference
Unfortunately, there is no formal record of what was said during the Charlottetown meetings. What we know has been gathered from private sources, such as letters written home by delegates. We do know that there was agreement on the need for a detailed discussion of a potential union. We know that the Maritime delegates put aside their own poorly-supported ideas of Maritime Union, while the Canadians could see solutions to their own problems in a larger union.

The majority of the conference took place at the colony's legislative building, Province House, although some social functions such as dinners and banquets were held at other venues including Government House and Inkerman House, the home of the colony's Lieutenant Governor.

The conference had begun on Thursday September 1 with a banquet for the delegates. Parties and banquets were held each night after the day's discussions had ended, except for Sunday September 4, when they did not meet. The representatives from the Province of Canada dominated the conference, overshadowing the concerns of the Maritimes, and laying out foundations for the union that benefited them the most. Four of the first five days were spent outlining the Canadian position, and the Maritime representatives did not discuss their own plans until September 6 and 7. One Canadian delegate, George Brown, spent two days discussing the details of the proposed constitution, which would keep Canada within the British Empire. 

Most of the Maritimes were convinced that a wider union including the Province of Canada would also be beneficial to them; Prince Edward Island was unsure, however, and very much against confederation. The delegates also believed that union could be achieved within a few years, rather than in an undefined period in the future as they had originally planned. The initial intentions of the conference was for the Maritimes to discuss the possibility of a union within provinces. The Province of Canada (consisting of present-day Ontario and Quebec) requested one of their own delegates to attend the conference. If not for the inclusion of 8 Canadian delegates from the province of Canada, the constitution would not have been proposed within federal union.

The conference concluded on Wednesday September 7, but the representatives agreed to meet again the next month in both Halifax, Nova Scotia, and Quebec City (see Quebec Conference). A ball was also held on September 8, after which the delegates returned home. In addition to political meetings, the delegates participated in social activities like special lunches, small boating trips, and a ball, which gave delegates the opportunity to bond. The delegates from respected provinces met again on September 10 and 12, 1864 in Halifax, Nova Scotia, where further discussions arose regarding the union and idea of the constitution. Following meetings in Halifax, representatives met in Quebec city, on October 10 to 27, 1864. The Quebec Conference fostered a draft constitution for the proposed federal union.

Confederation 
Canada, created on July 1, 1867, through practical means of negotiation at the aforementioned conferences above. To the south during the years of 1861 to 1864 there was the creation of the United States army during the Civil War. Given the large power created to the South some believed that Confederation considered as a pre-emptive action to reduce the chances that territories to the west and north of the Canadas would be annexed by the United States. This, combined with the pressures of countries

Delegates

New Brunswick
Edward Barron Chandler
John Hamilton Gray
John Mercer Johnson
Albert James Smith
William H. Steeves
Samuel Leonard Tilley

Nova Scotia
Adams George Archibald
Robert B. Dickey
William Alexander Henry
Jonathan McCully
Charles Tupper

Prince Edward Island

George Coles
Andrew Archibald Macdonald
Edward Palmer
William Henry Pope
John Hamilton Gray

Province of Canada
George Brown
Alexander Campbell
George-Étienne Cartier
Alexander Tilloch Galt
Hector-Louis Langevin
John A. Macdonald
William McDougall
Thomas D'Arcy McGee
John Ros

See also
Quebec Conference, 1864
London Conference, 1866
Anti-Confederation Party

References

Bibliography

External links
Charlottetown Conference of 1864
Canadian Confederation, a virtual museum exhibition at Library and Archives Canada

Canadian Confederation
History of Charlottetown
Constitutional conventions (political meeting)
1864 in Canada
1864 conferences
Events of National Historic Significance (Canada)